Sir Thomas Gordon Walker  (14 September 1849 – 27 November 1917) was a British Indian civil servant.

Early life and career 
Born to Reverend Henry Walker, he was educated in the Old Gymnasium and University of Aberdeen.

He joined I.C.S., as Assistant Commissioner in the Punjab, 1872; Settlement Officer, 1877–81; Registrar, Chief Court, 1881–88; Commissioner of Excise, 1888–99; Judge. Chief Court, Punjab, 1898–02; Commissioner, Delhi Division, 1901–05; Financial Commissioner, Punjab, and Member, Imperial Legislative Council, 1905–06; Lieut.-Governor, Punjab, 1907–08. He also served as a vice-chancellor of University of the Punjab.

Member, Durbar Coronation Committee, 1902–03; retired, 1912; m. Adela, d. of Rev. Arthur Irwin, Rector of Napton, Warwickshire, 1879.

References

1849 births
1917 deaths
Knights Commander of the Order of the Indian Empire
Companions of the Order of the Star of India
Governors of Punjab (British India)
Indian Civil Service (British India) officers
Members of the Imperial Legislative Council of India